Yazdi is a common name for someone from the city or province of Yazd in central Iran.

Notable people
Sharaf ad-Din Ali Yazdi (died 1454), Iranian scholar
Jalal al-Din Yazdi (died 1618), Iranian astrologer and chronicler of the Safavid period
Abdul-Karim Ha'eri Yazdi (1859–1937), Iranian Grand Ayatollah and founder of the Islamic seminary hawza in Qom, Iran
Ebrahim Yazdi (1931–2017), Former Iranian politician and senior diplomat
Mohammad Yazdi (1931–2020), Senior Iranian cleric and Judiciary official
Mohammad-Taqi Mesbah-Yazdi (born 1934), Senior Iranian cleric and long-serving member of the Assembly of Experts
Mohammad Ali Jafari (born 1957), Chief Commander of the Islamic Revolutionary Guards Corps (IRGC); born in Yazd
Mohammad Khatami (born 1943), Former President of Iran; born in Yazd
Mohammad Reza Aref (born 1951), Vice President of Iran from 2001 to 2005 and current member of Parliament for Tehran, Rey, Shemiranat and Eslamshahr constituency; born in Yazd
Yazdi Naoshriwan Karanjia (born 1937), Indian theatre personality

Other uses
Yazdi, a dialect of the Zoroastrian Dari language

See also
 Yazidis, a group native to Mesopotamia

Iranian-language surnames